I-270 may refer to:

 Interstate 270 (disambiguation), one of several highways
 Mikoyan-Gurevich I-270, a cancelled Soviet interceptor aircraft